Australia won the 1921 Ashes series held in England. They won the first three matches against England, which meant that they had won eight in succession, an unequalled sequence in Ashes Tests, following the 5-0 drubbing they had administered to England in the 1920–21 season in Australia. The last two matches of the Test series were drawn. England chose 30 different players across the five Tests - still the record for the most players used by one side in a series.

In addition to the Test matches, the Australian team played first-class matches against all the major teams in England, plus some less important matches. In all, they played 38 matches, winning 22 of them, drawing 14 and losing just twice, both times towards the end of the season.

The touring party
 Warwick Armstrong, captain
 Tommy Andrews
 Warren Bardsley
 Hanson Carter
 Herbie Collins
 Jack Gregory
 Hunter Hendry
 Charlie Macartney
 Ted McDonald
 Arthur Mailey
 Edgar Mayne
 Bert Oldfield
 Nip Pellew
 Jack Ryder
 Johnny Taylor

Test series summary

First Test

Second Test

Third Test

Fourth Test
{{Two-innings cricket match
| date = 23–26 July 1921(3-day match)
| team1 = 
| team2 = 

| score-team1-inns1 = 362/4d (120 overs)
| runs-team1-inns1 = CAG Russell 101
| wickets-team1-inns1 = WW Armstrong 2/57 (33 overs)

| score-team2-inns1 = 175 (116.4 overs)
| runs-team2-inns1 = HL Collins 40
| wickets-team2-inns1 = CH Parkin 5/38 (29.4 overs)

| score-team1-inns2 = 44/1 (13 overs)
| runs-team1-inns2 = CH Parkin 23
| wickets-team1-inns2 = TJE Andrews 1/23 (5 overs)

| score-team2-inns2 = 
| runs-team2-inns2 = 
| wickets-team2-inns2 =

| result = Match drawn
| report = Scorecard
| venue = Old Trafford, Manchester
| umpires = J Moss and AE Street
| toss = England won the toss and elected to bat.
| rain = There was no play on the first day.
24 July was taken as a rest day.
| notes = C Hallows and CWL Parker (both ENG) made their Test debuts.
}}

Fifth Test

Annual reviews
 Wisden Cricketers' Almanack 1922

References

Further reading
 Bill Frindall, The Wisden Book of Test Cricket 1877-1978, Wisden, 1979
 Chris Harte, A History of Australian Cricket'', Andre Deutsch, 1993

1921 in Australian cricket
1921 in English cricket
1921
English cricket seasons in the 20th century
International cricket competitions from 1918–19 to 1945
1921